The 1995 French Grand Prix was a Formula One motor race held at Magny-Cours on 2 July 1995. It was the seventh race of the 1995 Formula One World Championship.

The 72-lap race was won by Michael Schumacher, driving a Benetton-Renault. Damon Hill took pole position in his Williams-Renault and led until he was overtaken by Schumacher during the first round of pit stops. Schumacher's eventual winning margin over Hill was 31 seconds, with Hill's teammate David Coulthard third.

Classification

Qualifying

Race

Championship standings after the race

Drivers' Championship standings

Constructors' Championship standings

Note: Only the top five positions are included for both sets of standings.

References 

French Grand Prix
Grand Prix
French Grand Prix
French Grand Prix